Value for Money is a 1955 British comedy film directed by Ken Annakin, based on the novel of the same name by Derrick Boothroyd. It stars John Gregson, Diana Dors, Susan Stephen and Derek Farr.

Plot

Chayley Broadbent has had the importance of frugality impressed upon him all his life by his Yorkshire father. When his father dies, he inherits £62,000 [the equivalent of £ in ], which includes the clothing factory his father founded in the (fictional) town of Barfield. However, his behaviour does not change as he continues to hear his father's words in his head.

He asks his girlfriend Ethel to marry him but is extremely unromantic, telling her it is to save money on his housekeeper, but despite reacting angrily she loves him so accepts. But Chayley takes her words to heart and, for the first time in his life, leaves his home town of Barfield and visits London with the local football supporters who are attending the FA Cup Final. In the evening, after the football, he joins the crowd and goes to a West End show where he gets pulled on stage by a showgirl, Ruthine, to whom he takes a liking and takes her flowers after the show. She suggests they go to dinner in a posh restaurant, where he talks mostly about himself, explaining that "Chayley" was a mistake in the London registrar mishearing his father's Yorkshire pronunciation of 'Charlie'. He asks her for a photograph of herself which she signs for him. Then, his 'look after the pennies' attitude leads to him questioning the bill and working it out on paper, which does reveal he has been overcharged, but all to the great embarrassment of Ruthine. He then rushes off at midnight to catch the coach back to Barfield, rather than taking her home. Back in her room, she complains to her roommate but says she doesn't expect to see him again.

Back in the north, Chayley shows Ethel his photo of Ruthine. He is surprised and dismayed when she angrily rips it up.

He goes back to London and takes Ruthine out to dinner again, to the same restaurant. This goes better but he is too eager and when he asks her to marry him, she says no, as she doesn't love him and wants to marry someone who has made something of himself, and storms off. Trying to follow her, Chayley hurriedly pays the bill and says "Keep the change", with the apparently French waiter remarking "Blimey!".

Back in Yorkshire, he decides to be the kind of man that Ruthine wants, and, taking the mayor's advice on how to do this, he offers to give the Council some land he owns in the town centre for the children's playground and community centre planned by the mayor. He joins the local council. The local newspaper, where Ethel works as a reporter, runs an article on his generosity, but Ethel remains unimpressed, especially when Chayley says he is bringing Ruthine to Barfield. He goes to London to invite her personally to the opening of the centre which is to be built on his land. Her roommate persuades her to go as, even if she does not like him, she will meet other rich people.

Ruthine is surprised by how built-up and dirty Barfield is and how small and old-fashioned Chayley's house is, where his plan is for her to stay overnight. When she asks for a bath, the housekeeper says it is not plumbed in so she will boil a kettle for her, and directs her to the outside lavatory, saying to be careful when she pulls the chain.

Getting ready to leave town and give up on Chayley, Ethel jumps at the chance to interview Ruthine in her capacity as a TV personality. Ruthine confides in her that she has no intention of staying overnight in Chayley's house. However, at the opening ceremony, Ruthine hears several stories about how wealthy Chayley is. Ruthine and the invited elderly lord perform the opening, and Ruthine and the mayor slide down the slide for the press. Ruthine finally establishes what Chayley is worth and immediately begins being affectionate with him.

The dignitaries and crowd move to the swimming pool where Ruthine christens the pool with a dive from the high board.

Chayley goes to buy an engagement ring but still buys the £20 ring rather than the £250 ring suggested by the assistant. Ruthine is now staying in a hotel, with Chayley paying the bill, and she starts to rack up the expenses. She insists that Chayley buy a seven-bedroom historic villa, telling him that she got the price knocked down from £6000 to £5800. When he sees the seller of the house is one of his local business competitors, he tells him the deal is off and storms off. Back in his office, he agonises over the latest bills from Ruthine's hotel. When he goes to the hotel, Ruthine speaks to him from the bathroom, saying she is having a bath and keeps mentioning the bedroom, trying to seduce him. But when she comes out of the bathroom dressed in a negligee and leans into him pouting, he hears his father's voice warning him about women, and he puts a cigarette in her mouth and quickly leaves.

Ruthine phones the newspaper, not realising Ethel is the ex-girlfriend. Getting together, they decide Chayley is a rat and get drunk together in the suite. But Ethel appreciates that Ruthine has changed Chayley. They decide to teach him a lesson.

Chayley receives two writs for breach of promise: one for £5000 from Ruthine and one for £200 from Ethel. He is summoned to see the Mayor who has an advance proof of the newspaper headline for the next day, exposing councillor Chayley as a love rat, engaged to two women. His friends advise marrying Ruthine, because that is the cheaper option, but Chayley chooses Ethel, telling her she is worth paying Ruthine £5000. Outside, Chayley sees the wealthy man whose house he was to buy who asks if he can now approach Ruthine to whom he has taken a liking, and that if he marries Ruthine he will give Chayley the £5000.

We jump to the joint weddings of Chayley to Ethel and Ruthine to her wealthy husband. Chayley tells the portrait of his father that he does not need to look at the lavish celebrations and turns the portrait to the wall.

Cast
 John Gregson as Chayley Broadbent
 Diana Dors as Ruthine West
 Susan Stephen as Ethel
 Derek Farr as Duke Popplewell
 Frank Pettingell as Mayor Higgins
 Charles Victor as Lumm
 Ernest Thesiger as Lord Dewsbury
 Jill Adams as Joy
 Joan Hickson as Mrs. Perkins
 Donald Pleasence as Limpy
 John Glyn-Jones as Arkwright
 Leslie Phillips as Robjohns
 Ferdy Mayne as Waiter
 Charles Lloyd-Pack as Mr. Gidbrook

Production
The film was based on a novel by Derrick Boothroyd was published in 1953.

Producer Sergei Nolbandov did not want Diana Dors in the movie but Ken Annakin, who had directed the actor in Vote for Huggett, insisted. She was paid £5,000; it was her first movie under a three picture contract with Rank.

Filming started 28 December 1954. It was the first film shot under Rank's new program to shoot everything in VistaVision. Filming took place at Pinewood Studios. Much of the Yorkshire location filming was in Batley, West Riding of Yorkshire, historically an area within the Heavy Woollen District.

Reception
Variety said the film will "give considerable amusement to unsophisticated local audiences, but which, may find it tough sledding in the Overseas territory. In the U. S,, particularly, the Yorkshire dialect will not be a selling aid. This is a modestly amusing piece, staged on a bigger scale than the story would seem to warrant, and offering a touch of spectacle in a couple of song and dance numbers."

Filmink argued the movie should have focused on Dors rather than Gregson.

References

External links
 
 
 Value for Money at BFI

1955 films
1955 comedy films
British comedy films
Films based on British novels
Films directed by Ken Annakin
Films shot at Pinewood Studios
Films set in London
Films set in Yorkshire
1950s English-language films
1950s British films